The Ghana Air Force (GHF) is the aerial warfare organizational military branch of the Ghanaian Armed Forces (GAF). The GHF, along with the Ghanaian army (GA) and Ghanaian navy (GN), make up the Ghanaian Armed Forces (GAF), which are controlled by the Ghanaian Ministry of Defence (MoD).

History
The GHF (Ghana Air Force) started on 24 July 1959 as a Flying Training School with Israeli instructors and technicians, under the command of Lt. Col. Adam Shatkay of the IAF.  The School was established as a cradle of a service to complement the Army and the Navy. Later that year a headquarters was established in Accra under the command of Indian Air commodore K. Jaswant-Singh who was appointed as the first Chief of Air Staff (CAS).
In 1960 Royal Air Force personnel took up the task of training the newly established Ghana Air Force and in 1961 they were joined by a small group of Royal Canadian Air Force personnel.  In September 1961 as part of President Kwame Nkrumah's Africanization program, a Ghanaian CAS was appointed, with the first being J.E.S. de Graft-Hayford, born in the U.K. of Ghanaian descent.

The Ghana Air Force was in the beginning equipped with a squadron of Chipmunk trainers, and squadrons of Beavers, Otters and Caribou transport aircraft. In addition a DH125 jet was bought for Kwame Nkrumah, Hughes helicopters were bought for mosquito spraying plus DH Doves and Herons.  British-made Westland Whirlwind helicopters and a squadron of Italian-made MB-326 ground attack/trainer jets were also purchased.

In 1962 the national School of Gliding was set up by Hanna Reitsch, who was once Adolf Hitler's top personal pilot.  Under the command of Air Commodore de Graft-Hayford, she served as director, operations instructor and trainer of the school.  She also acted as the personal pilot of Kwame Nkrumah from 1962–1966.

Organisation
The GHF headquarters is located at Burma Camp and the main transport airfield is the Air Force Base Accra, which shares the same runway with the Kotoka International Airport.  Other GHF airfields  include:
 Air Force Base Tamale, which shares its runway with the Tamale Airport.
 GHF Air Force Station Sekondi-Takoradi started as RAF Station Takoradi, then became Ghana Air Force Station Sekondi-Takoradi on 1 March 1961. The Chipmunk Basic Trainer Aircraft was the first aircraft used at the Station with an all Rank Air Force Station. 
GHF Air Force station Accra came into being soon after the Royal Air Force (RAF) had taken over the administration from the Indian and Israeli Air Force officers at the beginning of 1961. The station was housed at No 3 hangar at the Accra Airport (Kotoka International Airport) with hardly any aircraft. The Unit had four main sub-units, i.e. the Administration Wing, Flying Wing, Technical Wing and Equipment Wing. The School of Technical Training was also located at this station. The Station moved from No 3 hangar to its present location in Burma Camp towards the end of 1965.

Mission

The role of the Ghana Air Force, as defined in the National Defence Policy, is to provide "Air Transport and Offensive Air Support to the Ghana Armed Forces and to protect the territorial air space of Ghana". The National Defense Policy states certain specific tasks which the Ghana Air Force is expected to perform:

 To maintain Fighter Ground Attack capability and provide Close Air Support during operation.
 To provide transport support to the Ghana Armed Forces.
 To provide surveillance over the air space of Ghana and over the Exclusive Economic Zone (EEZ).
 To provide liaison and recce flight capability.
 To provide VIP flight capability.
 To provide transport support for civilians as government directs.
 To provide medical evacuation and air rescue assistance.
  
The Ghana Air Force is also responsible for the co-ordination and direction of Search and Rescue (SAR) within the Accra Flight Information Region.

Aircraft

Active inventory

Retired 
Previous notable aircraft operated were the Aermacchi MB-339, MB-326, DHC-4 Caribou, Fokker F27 Friendship, de Havilland Heron, Short Skyvan, BN-2 Islander,  Beagle Husky, DHC-3 Otter, Cessna 172, Bell 212, Westland Wessex, Aérospatiale Alouette III, Mil Mi-2, Scottish Aviation Bulldog, DHC-1 Chipmunk, L-29 Delfín, and the Aero L-39ZO

Chiefs of Air Staff

The senior appointment in the GHF is the Chief of Air Staff. The following is a list of the Ghana Air Force Chiefs of Air Staff:

Rank structure

The GHF's rank structure is similar to the RAF's rank structure from where its ranks were derived.

Commissioned officers

Enlisted

References 

World Aircraft Information Files. Brightstar Publishing, London. File 338 Sheet 03
Veep Commissions CASA -C295 Aircraft Into Armed Forces Service. Ghanaian Times. newtimes.com.gh.
Defence Equipment & Technology. janes.com''.

External links

Military units and formations established in 1959
Military of Ghana
Air forces by country
Aviation in Ghana
Military aviation in Africa
1959 establishments in Ghana